The 1997–98 Japan Figure Skating Championships were the 66th edition of the event. They were held on December 12–14, 1997 in Kobe. National Champions were crowned in the disciplines of men's singles, ladies' singles, pair skating, and ice dancing. As well as crowning the national champions of Japan for the 1997–98 season, the results of this competition were used to assist in choosing the teams for the 1998 Winter Olympics and the 1998 World Championships.

Results

Men

Ladies

Pairs

Ice dancing

External links
 1997–98 Japan Figure Skating Championships results

Japan Figure Skating Championships
1997 in figure skating
1998 in figure skating
1997 in Japanese sport